Beledi is a rural locality (a selo) in Godoberinsky Selsoviet, Botlikhsky District, Republic of Dagestan, Russia. The population was 93 as of 2010.

Geography 
Beledi is located 20 km west of Botlikh (the district's administrative centre) by road. Zabirkhali is the nearest rural locality.

References 

Rural localities in Botlikhsky District